Unikili is a village in West Godavari district in the state of Andhra Pradesh in India.

Demographics
 India census, Unikili has a population of 5386 of which 2713 are males while 2673 are females. The average sex ratio of Unikili village is 985. The child population is 461, which makes up 8.56% of the total population of the village, with a sex ratio of 1031. In 2011, the literacy rate of Unikili village was 77.02% when compared to 67.02% of Andhra Pradesh.

See also 
 Eluru

References 

Villages in West Godavari district